Montague County is a county located in the U.S. state of Texas, established in 1857. As of the 2020 census, its population was 19,965. The county seat is Montague. The county was created in 1857 and organized the next year. It is named for Daniel Montague, a surveyor and soldier in the Mexican–American War.

History
In the mid- to late 19th century, the county was the site of the trading post known as Red River Station, established near the river of the same name by Jesse Chisholm, a Cherokee merchant who also served as an important interpreter for the Republic of Texas and the United States. Together with Black Bear, a Lenape guide, he had scouted and developed what became known as the Chisholm Trail north through Indian Territory, where he had more trading posts, and into Kansas.

In the post-Civil War period, ranchers suffered from low prices for their beef cattle, as overproduction had occurred during the war, when their regular markets were cut off. Learning about high prices and demand in the East, they began to have their cattle driven to railheads in Kansas for shipment to the east. Red River Station became the southern terminus for the Chisholm Trail, and the gathering place for thousands of Texas Longhorns during annual cattle drives to railheads in Kansas. Over the years, an estimated five million cattle were driven north to Kansas. The cattle were gathered by cowboys from ranches in East and West Texas; the cattle were then driven overland north to Kansas. They were shipped east, where they could command much higher prices. After railroads were constructed into Texas, the cattle drives to Kansas ended.

Geography

Adjacent counties
 Jefferson County, Oklahoma (north)
 Love County, Oklahoma (northeast)
 Cooke County (east)
 Wise County (south)
 Jack County (southwest)
 Clay County (west)

National protected area
 Lyndon B. Johnson National Grassland (part)

Demographics

Note: the US Census treats Hispanic/Latino as an ethnic category. This table excludes Latinos from the racial categories and assigns them to a separate category. Hispanics/Latinos can be of any race.

As of the census of 2000,  19,117 people, 7,770 households, and 5,485 families were residing in the county.  The population density was 20 people per sq mi (8/km2).  The 9,862 housing units averaged 11 per sq mi (4/km2).  The racial makeup of the county was 95.95% White, 0.18% African American, 0.74% Native American, 0.26% Asian, 1.67% from other races, and 1.21% from two or more races.  About 5.41% of the population was Hispanic or Latino of any race.

Of the 7,770 households,  28.70% had children under the age of 18 living with them, 58.10% were married couples living together, 8.80% had a female householder with no husband present, and 29.40% were not families. About 27.10% of all households were made up of individuals, and 14.70% had someone living alone who was 65 years of age or older.  The average household size was 2.41, and the average family size was 2.91.

In the county, the age distribution was 24.00% under 18, 6.80% from 18 to 24, 24.30% from 25 to 44, 25.10% from 45 to 64, and 19.80% who were 65 or older.  The median age was 41 years. For every 100 females, there were 92.50 males.  For every 100 females age 18 and over, there were 89.80 males.

The median income for a household in the county was $31,048, and for a family was $38,226. Males had a median income of $31,585 versus $19,589 for females. The per capita income for the county was $17,115.  About 10.00% of families and 14.00% of the population were below the poverty line, including 17.80% of those under age 18 and 11.90% of those age 65 or over.

Education
These school districts serve Montague County:
 Alvord ISD (mostly in Wise County)
 Bowie ISD (small portion in Clay, Jack Counties)
 Forestburg ISD
 Gold-Burg ISD (small portion in Clay County)
 Montague ISD
 Nocona ISD
 Prairie Valley ISD
 Saint Jo ISD (small portion in Cooke County)
 Slidell ISD (partly in Wise, Denton counties; small portion in Cooke County)

In addition, a branch of North Central Texas College operates in Bowie.

Transportation

Major highways
  U.S. Highway 81
  U.S. Highway 82
  U.S. Highway 287
  State Highway 59
  State Highway 101
  State Highway 175

Farm to Market Roads

  FM 103
  FM 174
  FM 455
  FM 677
  FM 730
  FM 922
  FM 1106
  FM 1125
  FM 1630
  FM 1655
  FM 1749
  FM 1758
  FM 1759
  FM 1806
  FM 1815
  FM 1816
  FM 1956
  FM 2382
  FM 2634
  FM 2849
  FM 2953
  FM 3043
  FM 3301
  FM 3394
  FM 3428

Communities

Cities
 Bowie
 Nocona
 St. Jo

Census-designated places
 Montague
 Nocona Hills
 Sunset

Other unincorporated communities

 Belcherville
 Bonita
 Capps Corner
 Corinth
 Forestburg
 Illinois Bend
 Ringgold
 Spanish Fort
 Stoneburg

Ghost town
 Red River Station

Politics
Republican Drew Springer, Jr., a businessman from Muenster in Cooke County, represents Montague County in the Texas House of Representatives. He carried the county in the 2012 Republican runoff election.

Prior to 1996, Montague County was strongly Democratic in presidential elections. The only Republican Party candidates who managed to win the county from 1912 to 1992 were Herbert Hoover, due to anti-Catholic sentiment towards Al Smith, and Richard Nixon and Ronald Reagan in their 49-state landslides of 1972 and 1984, respectively. Since 1996, the county has swung hard to the supporting Republican Party similar to almost all White-majority rural counties in the Solid South, with its presidential candidates winning by increasing margins in each passing election. As a testament to how strongly Republican the county has swung, Donald Trump defeated Hillary Clinton by a margin over 75% in 2016, compared to an only 4.7% margin Bob Dole won the county by 20 years prior at the start of its Republican trend.

See also

 National Register of Historic Places listings in Montague County, Texas
 Recorded Texas Historic Landmarks in Montague County
 Buford T. Justice

References

External links
 Montague County government's website
 Montague County in Handbook of Texas Online at the University of Texas
 Historic Montague County materials, hosted by the Portal to Texas History.
 Montague County QuickFacts from the US Census Bureau

 
1858 establishments in Texas
Populated places established in 1858